Night at the Museum is a 2006 fantasy comedy film directed by Shawn Levy and written by Robert Ben Garant and Thomas Lennon. It is based on the 1993 children's book of the same name by Croatian illustrator Milan Trenc. The film had an ensemble cast of Ben Stiller in the lead role, Carla Gugino, Dick Van Dyke, Mickey Rooney, Bill Cobbs, and Robin Williams. It tells the story of a divorced father who applies for a job as a night watchman at New York City's American Museum of Natural History and subsequently discovers that the exhibits, animated by a magical Egyptian artifact, the tablet of Akhmenrah, come to life at night. 20th Century Fox released the film on December 22, 2006, and it grossed $574.5 million worldwide, becoming the 5th highest-grossing film of 2006, but received mixed reviews from critics.

Two sequels were released: Night at the Museum: Battle of the Smithsonian in 2009, and Night at the Museum: Secret of the Tomb in 2014. An animated sequel, Night at the Museum: Kahmunrah Rises Again, was released on December 9, 2022 for the streaming service Disney+.

Plot
In Brooklyn, Larry Daley is an aspiring inventor bouncing between jobs and apartments. His ex-wife Erica is sympathetic, but considers him a bad example to their ten-year-old son Nick, and Larry worries that Nick admires Erica's fiancé Don instead. Larry is hired as the night security guard at the Museum of Natural History, replacing retiring guard Cecil Fredericks and his colleagues Gus and Reginald. Cecil gives Larry an instruction manual, warning him not to "let anything in... or out".

On his first night, Larry discovers that the museum's exhibits come to life after sunset, including: "Rexy", a playful Tyrannosaurus skeleton; Dexter, a mischievous stuffed capuchin monkey who destroys Larry's manual, and other taxidermied animals; rival miniature civilizations depicting the Old West, Ancient Rome, and Ancient Maya; a chewing gum-loving Easter Island Moai; wax models of Attila the Hun, American Civil War soldiers, and pyromaniacal Neanderthals, as well as Sacagawea, who is encased in glass. A mounted Teddy Roosevelt rescues Larry from feuding miniature leaders Jedediah and Octavius, and explains that ever since an ancient Egyptian artifact – the Golden Tablet of Pharaoh Ahkmenrah – arrived in 1952, the exhibits come to life each night, but turn to dust if outside the museum at sunrise. As Teddy helps restore order, Larry learns that Teddy loves Sacagawea but is too shy to speak to her.

Cecil, Reginald, and Gus check on Larry, who has decided to quit, but Nick and Don stop by to congratulate him on his new job. Larry decides to stay for his son's sake, and Cecil advises reading up on history. Larry is better able to control the exhibits, but is forced to extinguish a fire in the Neanderthals' display, while Dexter steals Larry's keys and unlocks a window, allowing a Neanderthal to escape onto the street. Frustrated, Larry again decides to quit, and is unable to save the escaped Neanderthal from disintegrating in the rising sun. Nick witnesses museum director Dr. McPhee fire Larry over the damaged Neanderthal exhibit, though Larry convinces him to reconsider. Rebecca Hutman, a museum guide and historian writing her dissertation on Sacagawea, believes Larry is mocking her when he tells her the museum's nighttime secret.

Larry brings Nick to the museum but nothing comes to life, and they discover Cecil, Gus, and Reginald stealing the deactivated tablet. Like the exhibits, the elderly guards receive enhanced vitality from the tablet, and have plotted to steal it with other valuable artifacts and frame Larry. Nick reactivates the tablet, bringing the museum back to life, but Cecil takes it and locks Nick and Larry in the Egyptian room. Larry releases Ahkmenrah's mummy from his sarcophagus, and the pharaoh helps Larry and Nick escape. They find the other exhibits fighting amongst themselves, and Larry convinces them to unite to catch the guards and recover the tablet.

Gus and Reginald are captured, while Cecil escapes in a Pony Express stagecoach, and Teddy pushes Sacagawea out of Cecil's path and is sliced in half. Larry pursues Cecil into Central Park, stopping him and regaining the tablet, and Teddy finally bonds with Sacagawea as she repairs him. Rebecca sees the exhibits returning to the museum and realizes the truth, and Larry introduces her to Sacagawea. The next day, McPhee fires Larry after news reports about the night's strange events – such as the Neanderthals leaving cave paintings in the museum's subway station, and Rexy's dinosaur tracks in Central Park – but the publicity boosts museum attendance. Larry is rehired, and celebrates that night with Nick and the exhibits.

During the end credits, Cecil, Gus and Reginald are forced to work as museum janitors as punishment for their crimes.

Cast

Humans
 Ben Stiller as Larry Daley, a night-shift security guard at the American Museum of Natural History in New York, Nick's father, and Erica's former husband.
 Carla Gugino as Rebecca Hutman, a museum docent.
 Dick Van Dyke as Cecil Fredericks, a veteran security guard.
 Mickey Rooney as Gus, a veteran security guard, who takes an instant dislike to Larry.
 Bill Cobbs as Reginald, a veteran security guard.
 Jake Cherry as Nicholas "Nick" Daley, Larry's and Erica's son.
 Ricky Gervais as Dr. McPhee, the curator of the Museum of Natural History and Larry's boss.
 Kim Raver as Erica Daley, Larry's former wife and Nick's mother.
 Charlie Murphy as the taxi-driver.
 Paul Rudd as Don, Erica's fiancé.
 Anne Meara as Debbie.

Exhibits

 Robin Williams as Theodore Roosevelt, the wax sculpture of the 26th President of the United States., who befriends Larry.
 Patrick Gallagher as a wax model of Attila The Hun, the statue of the leader of the Huns., who antagonizes Larry at first.
 Rami Malek as the mummy of Ahkmenrah, an Egyptian pharaoh who is the owner of the tablet.
 Pierfrancesco Favino as a bronze statue of Christopher Columbus, whose name Larry consistently forgets.
 Steve Coogan as Octavius, a miniature Roman general figure.
 Mizuo Peck as Sacagawea, the polyurethane model of the Lemhi Shoshone woman who is Theodore Roosevelt's girlfriend. 
 Owen Wilson as Jedediah, a miniature cowboy figure, who is uncredited and only credited in the rest of the film series.
 Kerry van der Griend, Dan Rizzuto, Matthew Harrison, and Jody Racicot as wax models of Neanderthals.
 Martin Christopher as a wax model of Meriwether Lewis.
 Martin Sims as a wax model of William Clark.
 Randy Lee, Darryl Quon, Gerald Wong, and Paul Chih-Ping Cheng as wax models of Huns.
 Brad Garrett as the voice of the Easter Island Head.
 Crystal the Monkey as Dexter, a stuffed Capuchin monkey.
 Roger Lewis as Cowboy 
 Jonathan Lee as Chinese Rail Worker
 Jason Mckinnon as Irish Worker
 Jason Vaisvila, and Cade Wagar as wax models of Viking
 Cory Martin as Chinese Terra Cota Soldier
 Gary Sievers as Viking Warrior
 Trevor Addie as Roman
 Dave Hospes as Cowboy
 Lloyd Adams as Soldier
 Matthew Walker as Politician

Production

The building featured in the film, which was constructed on a sound stage in Burnaby, British Columbia, is based on the American Museum of Natural History in New York City, external shots of which were used in the movie.

Trainers spent several weeks training Crystal, who plays the troublemaking monkey Dexter, to slap and bite Stiller in the film.

Director Shawn Levy credited Ben Stiller for the ensemble cast: "When actors hear that Ben Stiller is in a movie they want to work with him. It['s] a high-water mark and it absolutely draws actors in and I'm convinced that's a big part of why we got this cast."

Music

Songs
 "Friday Night" - performed by McFly; not featured in American version of the film, but heard in some international cuts, used during the end credits. It can be heard on the American DVD on the Spanish dub.
 "September" - performed by Earth, Wind and Fire; used before the end credits where everyone in the museum is partying.
 "Weapon of Choice" - performed by Fatboy Slim; used in the scene where Larry returns to the museum for his second night and is preparing for the chaos.
 "Tonight" - performed by Keke Palmer featuring Cham; used for the end credits.
 An instrumental version of "Mandy" by Barry Manilow is used when Larry is standing in the elevator, while escaping from Attila the Hun.
 "Ezekiel Saw Them Dry Bones" is the tune Larry whistles as he passes the empty T. rex exhibit on his first night.
 "Camptown Races" by Stephen Foster is sung by the townspeople of the American West miniature diorama. This is a period-correct song.

Score
Alan Silvestri replaced John Ottman as score composer. Silvestri's score was used for the teaser trailer of Horton Hears a Who!

Track list
Varèse Sarabande released a soundtrack album of the score on December 19, 2006.

Release
Night at the Museum had its premiere in New York City on December 17, 2006. It was later released on December 22, 2006 in the United States, December 26, 2006 in UK, January 12, 2007 in Brazil, on February 14, 2007 in China and on March 17, 2007 in Japan.

Reception

Box office
At the end of its box office run, Night at the Museum earned a gross of $250.9 million in the US and Canada and $323.6 million in other territories, for a worldwide total of  $574.5 million. It was the fifth highest-grossing film of 2006 and also the highest-grossing film worldwide of the trilogy.

It was the highest-grossing film in its opening weekend, grossing $30.8 million and playing in 3,685 theaters, with a $8,258 per-theater average. For the four-day Christmas holiday weekend, it took in $42.2 million. The movie was also released in IMAX large screen format, often on-site at museums of science or natural history such as the Pacific Science Center in Seattle.

In its second weekend, Night at the Museum expanded into 83 more theaters for a total of 3,768, and took in approximately $36.7 million, out-grossing its opening weekend. It maintained the top position in its third week, with an additional $23.7 million. Night at the Museum is the second highest-grossing film of 2006 in the United States and Canada, behind Pirates of the Caribbean: Dead Man's Chest.

During its international opening weekend of December 22, 2006, the film grossed a figure of an estimated $5 million, with the highest debut coming from South Korea ($5.04 million). The biggest market in the other territories were the UK, Japan, South Korea, and Germany, where it grossed $40.8 million, $30 million, $25.7 million, $22.9 million.

Critical response
On the review aggregator Rotten Tomatoes, Night at the Museum has an approval rating of  based on  reviews and an average rating of 5.2/10. The site's critical consensus read, "Parents might call this either a spectacle-filled adventure or a shallow and vapid CG-fest, depending on whether they choose to embrace this on the same level as their kids." , on Metacritic, the film had a score of 48 out of 100 based on 28 critics, indicating "mixed or average reviews". CinemaScore polls conducted during the opening weekend, cinema audiences gave the film an average grade of "A−" on an A+ to F scale.

Justin Chang of Variety magazine wrote: "This rambunctious, "Jumanji"-style extravaganza is a gallery of special effects in search of a story; rarely has so much production value yielded so little in terms of audience engagement." James Berardinelli of Reelviews gave it 2 stars out of 4, and commented on Stiller's performance by stating "It might be fair to give Ben Stiller an 'A' for effort, but to call what he does in this movie 'acting' is a misnomer. He does a lot of running around, occasionally falling down or bumping into things." One positive review by William Arnold of the Seattle Post-Intelligencer, gave it a B−, and stated that the film was "Out to impress and delight a family audience with the pageantry of human and natural history, and that's a surprisingly worthy ambition for a Hollywood comedy."

Museum officials at the American Museum of Natural History have credited the film for increasing the number of visitors during the holiday season by almost 20%. According to a museum official, between December 22, 2006, and January 7, 2007, there were 50,000 more visitors than during the same period the prior year.

Home media
The film was released on a 2-Disc DVD edition in the United Kingdom on April 23, 2007. It was released on 1-Disc and 2-Disc DVD editions and Blu-ray Disc format on April 24, 2007 elsewhere.

The film became the first non-Disney film to be reviewed by Ultimate Disney (now known as DVDizzy.com), due to the website dealing with other studios besides Disney.

, the film has sold 9,191,694 DVDs and grossed $153,566,058 in DVD sales.

Awards

Sequels

Night at the Museum was followed by a sequel titled Night at the Museum: Battle of the Smithsonian, which was released on May 22, 2009 in North America. A third film, Night at the Museum: Secret of the Tomb, was released on December 19, 2014 in North America.

In 2016, The Hollywood Reporter stated that the Alibaba Pictures Group intended to remake the film. On August 6, 2019, following the purchase of 21st Century Fox and its assets by The Walt Disney Company, Disney CEO Bob Iger announced that a fully animated sequel to Night at the Museum is in development. The project will be released as a Disney+ exclusive film, as a co-production between Walt Disney Studios Motion Pictures and 20th Century Studios. Night at the Museum: Kahmunrah Rises Again was released on December 9, 2022.

References

External links

 
 
 
 
 
 
 Independentfilm.com video interview with Mizuo Peck who played Sacagawea

2006 films
2000s adventure comedy films
2000s fantasy comedy films
2000s children's adventure films
2000s American films
American adventure comedy films
American fantasy adventure films
British fantasy comedy films
British fantasy adventure films
Cultural depictions of Christopher Columbus
Cultural depictions of Meriwether Lewis and William Clark
Films based on children's books
Films set in museums
Films set in New York City
Films shot in Vancouver
Films with live action and animation
IMAX films
Slapstick films
20th Century Fox films
20th Century Fox animated films
21 Laps Entertainment films
1492 Pictures films
Dune Entertainment films
Films directed by Shawn Levy
Films produced by Chris Columbus
Films produced by Michael Barnathan
Films scored by Alan Silvestri
2000s fantasy adventure films
Mummy films
2006 comedy films
Night at the Museum
American children's comedy films
Films about old age
2000s English-language films
2000s British films
Cultural depictions of Theodore Roosevelt